The National Organization of Immigrant and Visible Minority Women of Canada (NOIVMWC) was a Canadian non-profit women's organization that advocated for issues affecting immigrant and visible-minority women in Canada.

Founded in 1986, NOIVMWC advocates for pay equity and the rights of refugees.

In 2006, the organization undertook a project entitled "Creating Employment Opportunities for Immigrant Women," which held consultations with immigrant women and employers in metropolitan areas.

References

Organizations established in 1986
Women's organizations based in Canada
Multiculturalism in Canada
1986 establishments in Canada

Immigration to Canada
Feminist organizations in Canada